The Last Color is an Indian feature film produced and directed by Indian-American Chef Vikas Khanna. The film addresses an age old taboo surrounding widows in Vrindavan and Varanasi in India. It deals with how a 9-year old tightrope walker befriends one such widow and promises to add color to her life. The film is adapted from Khanna's own book 'The Last Color' published by Bloomsbury Publishing. Several students from Banaras Hindu University also worked as interns in this project.

Plot 
The story unfolds in the city of Varanasi, India where Chhoti, a nine-year-old tightrope walker and flower seller, dreams of saving 300 rupees ($4), so that she can attend school. She faces a daily struggle for survival along with her best friend Chintu. Chhoti befriends Noor, a white-clad widow who suffers a life of total abstinence and is prohibited from taking part in any festivities, especially Holi, the Indian festival of colors. Chotti tries to arrange a meeting between Anarkali, a transwoman who is brutally raped over and again by the local police named Raja, and Noor, whome she has recently befriended. He blackmails her into submission by threatening to rape Chotti who Anarkali is very fond of. Over time, Choti and Noor's friendship gets stronger and breaks the barriers of caste system but Noor and Anarkali never meet.

Noor encourages the brave little girl to face life by "flying high" with courage, education and dignity. She shares her fondest, but closely kept childhood memories of playing with colors. Chhoti promises Noor that, this Holi, she will splash colors on her. But on Holi's eve, Noor passes away, and during a sweep, Chhoti is imprisoned by the corrupt police, led by Raja who is trying to pin Anarkali's murder on Chotti who witnessed him murder the transwoman. Will Chhoti be able to keep her promise made to Noor?

Twenty-four years later, Chhoti becomes an advocate and fights for societal reforms that would bring about rehabilitation of both street children and widows after having won a case for transwomen. The Last Color is a story of promises kept and promises broken, a friendship that knows no bounds, and the freedom and victory of the human spirit.

Cast 
 Neena Gupta as Noor
 Rudrani Chettri as Anarkali
 Aqsa Siddiqui as Chhoti
 Rajeswar Khanna as Chintu
 Aslam Shekh as Raja
 Neha Garg as Rekha Saxena
 Princy Sudhakaran as Chhoti
 Vajid Ali as Chintu

Location 
This film was shot in Varanasi, Uttar Pradesh of India. A major part of the film was shot in Moti Jheel, also known as Moti Mahal, in Mehmoorganj and Assi Ghat.

Screenings 

Premiered at the 30th Palm Springs International Film Festival, USA on 4 January 2019.
13th Dallas International Film Festival
Indie Meme Film Festival
2019 Atlanta Film Festival
Closing night film at the New York Indian Film Festival
Special Screening at the United Nations HQ
Washington DC South Asian Film Festival
Opening night film at Chicago South Asian Film Festival
Mumbai Film Festival
New Jersey Indian & International Film Festival

Awards 
 Director's Vision Award, 16th Indian Film Festival Stuttgart
 Best Feature Film, Dallas International Film Festival

References

External links 
 

2010s Hindi-language films
2019 films